Racing Club de Ferrol is a Spanish football team based in Ferrol, Province of A Coruña, in the autonomous community of Galicia.

Founded in 1919, the club currently plays in Primera División RFEF – Group 1, holding home games at Estadio da Malata. Club colours are green shirts with white shorts, though during the early years of its existence green and white shirts with vertical stripes were used.

Although Ferrol has never played in Spain's top division of La Liga, the club has spent many years in the second tier before being in the third tier more recently. Ferrol holds the record for most seasons in the second tier without making La Liga.

History
The history of football in Ferrol is associated with the shipbuilding yards, workshops, foundries and drydocks and the British technical advisors, hired to work locally who used to play against each-other at first, but later on, local workers and military personnel stationed in Ferrol. The renewal of the shipyards and the creation, in town of the "school of Naval Engineers" meant that from the mid-nineteenth century, a mostly French at first but, latter on mostly British, Engineers and Technicians, a constant influx was developed; bringing to Ferrol not only new technologies (paid for by the Spanish state),but also, political ideas and ways for workers to unite against unfair salaries and working conditions (let's not forget that the creator of the Spanish Socialist Workers' Party (PSOE) and the Spanish General Workers' Union (UGT) was a man born in Ferrol at this time) and of course, football as well. This influx of Britons will increase exponentially from 1909 when Spain signed a massive contract with Vickers-Armstrong, John Brown and a few others though mostly Vickers-Armstrong for the renewal of the local dry-docks and dockyards and foundries after the Naval disaster of 1898. From those early years to these days many football clubs came and go over the decades but only one of them actually survived for a considerable time and for that, only as an amalgamation of some other previous teams and this is el Racing de Ferrol.

Racing Ferrol Football Club, can trace back its origins back to July 1919, but starting very strongly from the beginning on a massive winning all matches spree that allow the team to play against the best national squads in the country so only ten years after its creation Racing Ferrol Football Club was taking part on its first national championships competition and fluctuating later over the decades between first and second divisions as follows: the second – first presence in 1939–40 – and third divisions. In 1977–78 the Galicians won the inaugural edition of Segunda División B and promoted again, only to be immediately relegated back.

It would not until the year 2000 that Racing would again reach the second level, going on to spend there five of the following six years. In the 2006–07 campaign the club gained promotion to the category in the playoffs, with a 2–1 aggregate win against Alicante CF. In the following season the team finished fourth from the bottom and dropped back to the third division, and to the fourth only two years later.

Season to season

34 seasons in Segunda División
2 seasons in Primera División RFEF
27 seasons in Segunda División B
27 seasons in Tercera División

Current squad
.

Honours / Achievements

Regional
Galician Championships: 1928–29, 1937–38, 1938–39

Domestic
Campeonato de España / Copa del Generalísimo: Runner-up 1938–39
Segunda División B: Promotion 1999–00, 2006–07

Notable former players
Note: this list includes players that have played at least 100 league games and/or have reached international status.

Stadium

Estadio da Malata holds 12,043 spectators, and was built in 1993. The pitch dimensions are 105 x 68 metres.

Racing used three main stadiums over the years, starting with Campo de Futbol O Inferniño, which was utilized until a move to Estadio Manuel Rivera in 1954 took place. This was an oval-shaped enclosure with a single cantilever stand. In the 1970s, a cover was erected over the popular terrace.

In 1993, the metropolitan area of Ferrol built Estadio da Malata to the west of the town, near the valley of Serantes. The total cost of the development was 1700 million pesetas. The first match on the new grounds was played on 18 April 1993, in a 3–2 friendly win over Atlético Madrid B. The official inauguration took place on 29 August, in a triangular tournament featuring the home side and neighbours Celta de Vigo and Deportivo de La Coruña.

See also
Ferrol
SECN
Vickers-Armstrong
SDC Galicia Mugardos, reserve team

References

External links
Official website 
Futbolme team profile 
The British School @ Ferrol (1909–1936)
Aerial Views of Ferrol in North Western Spain 2004
Soccerway profile

 
Football clubs in Galicia (Spain)
Association football clubs established in 1919
1919 establishments in Spain
Segunda División clubs
Primera Federación clubs
Ferrol, Spain